Drachmobola is a genus of moths belonging to the subfamily Tortricinae of the family Tortricidae.

The description of Meyrick for this genus is:

The antennae of the male are shortly ciliated, palpi moderate, porrected, second joint rough-scaled above and beneath. Forewings with tufts of scales on surface and dorsal projection tufts; 7 to termen, 8 and 9 cut 7. Hindwings with 3 and 4 connate, 5 approximated, 6 and 7 stalked.

Species
Drachmobola dentiuncana Kuznetzov, 2003
Drachmobola insignitana (Moschler, 1891)
Drachmobola lobigera Diakonoff, 1975
Drachmobola periastra Meyrick, 1907
Drachmobola strigulata Meyrick, 1910

See also
List of Tortricidae genera

References

External links
tortricidae.com

Tortricidae genera